Elevation is the third solo album by guitarist and composer Lawson Rollins. Rollins co-produced the album with Persian-American musician and producer Shahin Shahida (of Shahin & Sepehr) and multi-platinum producer Dominic Camardella (Flora Purim, 3rd Force, Ottmar Liebert). The cast of 20 different musicians includes the Grammy winning violinist Charlie Bisharat, avante-garde electric guitarist Buckethead, Nepali sarangi player Kirin Nepali, Iranian vocalist Parsa Hassandokht, Nepali flute player Ruban Kumar Shrestha, Iranian santourist Pejman Eckhtiari, and Nepali tabla player Raju Maharjan. Associate producer William Aura of 3rd Force recorded the Nepali musicians in Kathmandu, Nepal. The Iranian musicians were recorded in Iran by co-producer Shahin Shahida.

Composition
Rollins composed all of the music on the album; however, the song "Parisian Rhapsody" was inspired by "Gymnopedie No. 1"  by Eric Satie. "Francisco's Dance" contains excerpts from "Capricho Arabe" by Francisco Tarrega.

Reception
Elevation received positive reviews from jazz, guitar, and world music critics.

The single from Elevation, "Daybreak", appeared on the Billboard top-30 Smooth Jazz Songs chart. The single peaked at #22.

Track listing

References

External links
Official site

2010 albums
Lawson Rollins albums